Pascal Godefroit is a Belgian paleontologist. He discovered dinosaurs like Olorotitan in 2003. Godefroit is the director of earth and life sciences at the Royal Belgian Institute of Natural Sciences.

See also
Taxa named by Pascal Godefroit

References

Belgian paleontologists
Living people
Date of birth missing (living people)
Year of birth missing (living people)